The 1876 United States presidential election in Nebraska took place on November 7, 1876 as part of the 1876 United States presidential election. Voters chose three representatives, or electors to the Electoral College, who voted for president and vice president.

Nebraska voted for the Republican nominee, Ohio Governor Rutherford B. Hayes, over the Democratic nominee, New York Governor Samuel J. Tilden by a margin of 29.4%.

With 64.70% of the popular vote, Nebraska would be Hayes' second strongest victory in terms of percentage in the popular vote after Vermont.

Results

See also
 United States presidential elections in Nebraska

References

Nebraska
1876
1876 Nebraska elections